Summadayze was an annual Australian music festival held in the month of January. The first event occurred on 1 January 1999 at the Sidney Myer Music Bowl in Melbourne. It subsequently expanded into a four city festival including one in New Zealand.  Summadayze was organised by Future Entertainment before it was liquidated in 2013.

Summadayze was held at Doug Jennings Park on the Gold Coast in 2003.  In 2004, the Summadayze festival was held in Melbourne, Gold Coast, Auckland and Perth. The 2006 event in Melbourne saw 23,000 tickets sellout for a 15-hour event. 35 drug-related arrests were made.  In 2011, events were again held in Melbourne, Adelaide, Gold Coast and Perth.  The Melbourne event saw 59 people arrested on drugs charges.

Lineups by year

2000
Derrick Carter
Bob Sinclar
Lo-Fidelity Allstars
Groove Armada
Krafty Kuts

2006
Fatboy Slim
Roger Sanchez
Tall Paul
Bodyrockers
Eddie Halliwell
Bob Sinclair

2008
Amongst others:

Groove Armada
David Guetta feat Chris Willis
New Young Pony Club
Steve Angello & *Sebastian Ingrosso
Felix Da Housecat
Sister Bliss (*Faithless)
Dave Spoon
Benny Benassi
Kissy Sell Out
Cosmic Gate
Joachim Garraud
Claude Von Stroke
Mason
Tenishia
Infusion
TV Rock

2009

Underworld
Ferry Corsten
Calvin Harris
David Morales
Adam Freeland

Armin van Buuren
Digitalism (live)
Cicada (live)
Boys Noize
Switch
Steve Aoki

Busy P
DJ Mehdi
Galvatrons
Malente
tyDi

2010

Carl Cox
The Presets
2manydjs
Sharam
Eddie Halliwell
Infected Mushroom (live)
Josh Wink
LCD Soundsystem (DJ Set)
Danny Howells
Nic Fanciulli
Tom Novy

Menno De Jong
Don Diablo
Krafty Kuts
Sinden
Fake Blood
Sebastien Leger
The Shapeshifters
The Ian Carey Project
Riton
Juan MacLean
Treasure Fingers

Evil Nine
Technotronic
Danny Tenaglia
Roger Sanchez
Clubfeet
Midnight Circus
Micah Decks N FX
Kenny L Project
Sketchism
Mind Electric
Collage

2011

Melbourne
David Guetta
N.E.R.D
Justice
Armand Van Helden
Chromeo
Bob Sinclar
Boys Noize
Erol Alkan
Tinie Tempah
Miami Horror
Riva Starr
Dennis Ferrer
Claude Von Stroke
Aeroplane
Nervo
Plump DJs
So Me v. DVNO
Yuksek
Zombie Disco Squad

Adelaide
David Guetta
Bob Sinclar
Boys Noize
Andy C
Miami Horror
Claude Von Stroke
Riva Starr
Dennis Ferrer
RJD2
Killa Kella
Nervo
Adrian Viola
N*E*R*D

Gold Coast
David Guetta
Armin Van Buuren
Justice (DJ Set)
N*E*R*D
Armand Van Helden

The Rapture
A-Trak
Bob Sinclar
Chromeo
Erol Alkan
Art vs. Science
Trentemoller Live
Boyz Noize
Dennis Ferrer
Miami Horror
Tinie Tempah
Riva Starr
Plump DJs
Claude Von Stroke
Jamaica
Nervo
Yuksek
Aeroplane
Zombie Disco Squad
So Me v. DVNO

Perth
David Guetta
Armin Van Buuren
N*E*R*D
Chromeo
Bob Sinclar
Boyz Noize
Erol Alkan
Tinie Tempah
Miami Horror
Riva Starr
Nervo
Aeroplane
Yuksek
Zombie Disco Squad

2012 

Pendulum
Snoop Dogg
Scissor Sisters
Moby DJ Set
Calvin Harris
Grandmaster Flash
Erick Morillo
Metronomy

Markus Schulz
Sasha
Tiga
Skream & Benga
Busy P
DJ Medhi
Seth Troxler

Stanton Warriors
Flying Lotus
In Flagranti
Spank Rock
Mighty Fools
Jack Beats
12th Planet

See also

Future Music Festival
List of festivals in Australia
List of music festivals

See also

List of electronic music festivals
Live electronic music

References

External links
 Summadayze Official website

Music festivals established in 1998
Concert tours
Summer festivals
Electronic music festivals in Australia
Electronic music festivals in New Zealand